Choiny may refer to the following places in Poland:
Choiny, Lublin Voivodeship (east Poland)
Choiny, Świętokrzyskie Voivodeship (south-central Poland)
Choiny, Garwolin County in Masovian Voivodeship (east-central Poland)
Choiny, Mińsk County in Masovian Voivodeship
Choiny, Ostrów Mazowiecka County in Masovian Voivodeship
Choiny, Wołomin County in Masovian Voivodeship